Tirumeeyachur Mehanadhar Temple
(திருமீயச்சூர் மேகநாதர் கோயில்) is a Hindu temple located at Thirumeeyachur in Tiruvarur district, Tamil Nadu, India. The presiding deity is Shiva. He is called as Meganathaswami. His consort is known as Lalithambika.

Significance 

It is one of the shrines of the 275 Paadal Petra Sthalams - Shiva Sthalams glorified in the early medieval Tevaram poems by Tamil Saivite Nayanar Tirugnanasambandar. Tirumeeyachur Ilamkovil Sakalabhuvaneswarar Temple is also found in this temple premises.

Literary mention 

Tirugnanasambandar describes the feature of the deity as:

References

External links

Gallery 

Shiva temples in Tiruvarur district
Padal Petra Stalam